Michał Przysiężny was the defending champion, but lost to Rajeev Ram in the first round.
Ram won the title, defeating Jan Hernych 7–5, 3–6, 7–6(8–6) in the final.

Seeds

Draw

Finals

Top half

Bottom half

References
 Main Draw
 Qualifying Draw

Internazionali Tennis Val Gardena Sudtirol - Singles
Internazionali Tennis Val Gardena Südtirol